Tom Bell (born 8 January 1981 in Nottingham) is an English comedy actor, and a creature and droid performer in the Star Wars franchise.

He has played a range of roles in the topical BBC comedy show The Mash Report and its Dave continuation Late Night Mash, portrayed the recurring character Jathro in Wizards vs Aliens and played Ubdurian alien Prashee in Star Wars: Episode VII - The Force Awakens.

Career

He began his career as one half of the sketch duo Tommy and the Weeks opposite Ed Weeks. Weeks was president of Cambridge Footlights while Bell was vice-president. Other work includes a long-running series of adverts as one of the 118 118 men, shows on community arts radio station Resonance FM, Lord Fear in the stage production Knightmare Live, numerous appearances with The Alternative Comedy Memorial Society and the one-man show Tom Bell Begins.

He appeared as himself in the fourth season of the Matt Damon and Ben Affleck reality series Project Greenlight, charting the developing of the HBO film The Leisure Class in which Bell stars with Weeks.

Selected filmography

Film
 Star Wars: Episode VII - The Force Awakens (2015) – creature and droid puppeteer
 The Leisure Class (2015) – Leonard
 The Current War (2016) – Reverend Vincent
 Solo: A Star Wars Story (2018) – creature and droid puppeteer
 The Aftermath (2019) – Captain Eliot
 A Guide to Second Date Sex (2019) – Adam

Television

 Dick and Dom's Funny Business (2011) – various
 Wizards vs Aliens (2012-2014) – Jathro
 Anna & Katy (2013) – various
 Big Bad World (2013) – Jerome
 Ludus (2014-2015) - Ludus
 Horrible Science (2015) – Bob
 Project Greenlight – himself
 Doctor Thorne (2016) – Lord Porlock
 American Dad! (2016) – Portrait Painter
 Ill Behaviour (2017) – Andrew
 Bromans (2017) – Dominus
 Lovesick (2018) – Ben
 Press (2018) – Jon Brooks
 The Mash Report (2018-2020) – various
 Harlots (2019) – Mr Bradley
 This Way Up (2019) – David
 Murder, They Hope (2021) – Barry
 Late Night Mash (2021) – various

Notes

External links
 Tom Bell's website

21st-century English male actors
Alumni of Trinity Hall, Cambridge
English male comedians
Living people
1981 births